Karpień Castle (Polish: Zamek Karpień; German: Burg Karpenstein) is located in Kłodzko County in the Golden Mountains.

The castle was the seat of a small feudal state.

Castles in Lower Silesian Voivodeship